Nazlıcan Parlak (born 27 May 1993) is a Turkish-born Azerbaijani footballer, who plays as a midfielder for the Turkish Women's Super League club Fenerbahçe and the Azerbaijan women's national team.

Club career 
Parlak played for the Romanian club Piroș Security before she returned to Turkey to join Konak Belediyespor to play in the 2021-22 Turkcell Super League.

International goals

See also 
List of Azerbaijan women's international footballers

References 

1994 births
Living people
Citizens of Azerbaijan through descent
Azerbaijani women's footballers
Women's association football midfielders
Azerbaijan women's international footballers
Azerbaijani expatriate footballers
Azerbaijani expatriate sportspeople in Romania
Expatriate women's footballers in Romania
Azerbaijani people of Turkish descent
People from Şişli
Footballers from Istanbul
Turkish women's footballers[
Turkish expatriate women's footballers
Turkish expatriate sportspeople in Romania
Turkish people of Azerbaijani descent
Sportspeople of Azerbaijani descent
[Category:Kireçburnu Spor players]]
Marmara Üniversitesi Spor players
Fatih Vatan Spor players
Ataşehir Belediyespor players
Konak Belediyespor players
Fenerbahçe S.K. women's football players
Turkish Women's Football Super League players